Afternoon Express is a South African advertiser-funded production variety magazine talk show produced by Cardova for SABC 3.

Presenters 
Palesa Tembe

Past presenters
 Jeannie D
Bonnie Mbuli
Bonang Matheba
Danilo Acquisto

History 
On 18 February 2015, a press release from SABC 3, stated that their longest running talk show, Three Talk, would come to an end on 20 April 2015. This comes after host of the show, Noleen Maholwana-Sangqu, announced her retirement after 12 years of service, however, other reports say the show had been cancelled due to low ratings. In April 2015, SABC 3 announced that Afternoon Express would take its place. The channel started broadcasting the show live on 4 May 2015.

References

External links
 Official site

South African television series
SABC 3 original programming